Laloor Bhagavathy Temple is a Hindu temple situated in Laloor, Thrissur City of Kerala, India. Cochin Devaswom Board  controls the temple. The temple is a participant in the Thrissur Pooram every year. It is one of the 108 Durga Temples in Kerala found by Saint Parasurama.

References

Hindu temples in Thrissur
Bhagavathi temples in Kerala
Thrissur Pooram